The Charm School is a 1988 spy thriller novel by American author Nelson DeMille, set in the Soviet Union.

In a 2010 FBI investigation, striking similarities were noted between the real life case and DeMille's book.

Plot
The novel's hero is U.S Air Force Colonel Sam Hollis, a former F-4 Phantom Fighter pilot who fought in Vietnam. Hollis was shot down during the war and was disqualified from flying. Later on he was transferred to US Air Force Intelligence and served as an intelligence officer and air attaché at the American embassy in Moscow. A young American MBA graduate driving in the Russian countryside encounters another American, claiming to have escaped a secret Russian POW camp—leaving numerous others behind who are still captive and being used to "Americanize" Soviet spies. When the information reaches Hollis, he begins to investigate and discovers a secret so dangerous that might cost him his life.

References

1988 American novels
Novels by Nelson DeMille
Novels set in Russia
Cold War spy novels
American spy novels